Lena Adriana Gonzalez (born January 26, 1981) is an American politician serving in the California State Senate. She was first elected to the State Senate to represent the 33rd District in a special election in June 2019 and was subsequently re-elected in the November 3, 2020 general election for her first full 4-year term. As State Senator, she represents nearly 1 million residents in Southeast Los Angeles, Signal Hill, portions of South Los Angeles and Lakewood, and her hometown of Long Beach.

Personal life and education 
Senator Gonzalez is the daughter of a union truck driver father and mother who immigrated from Aguascalientes, Mexico. She graduated with a bachelor's degree in Political Science from California State University Long Beach and a Master of Business Administration from Loyola Marymount University. She lives in Long Beach with her husband Adam and their three sons Zorion, Ethan and Luca.

Early Work and City Council 
Prior to her time in the Senate, Gonzalez worked for Microsoft where she led social impact programs on digital skills, the future of work and criminal justice reform. She spearheaded efforts to expand diversity and inclusion in the tech sector and to promote programs for underserved communities, such as supports for young girls of color in STEM.  

Simultaneously with her work in the private sector, she served on the Long Beach City Council from 2014 to 2019, representing 50,000 residents in Downtown Long Beach, including the Port of Long Beach. She served the city for a decade, both as an elected official and former staff member.

California State Senate 
In the Senate, Gonzalez currently is a member of the Special Committee on Pandemic Emergency Response, Energy, Utilities and Communications, Environmental Quality, Judiciary and Health committees. In addition, she was recently appointed as the new Chair of the Senate Transportation Committee, becoming the first Latina(o) to ever serve in this capacity and the only woman to serve in the last 20 years. On February 12, 2021, Senator Gonzalez was also appointed as Majority Whip, one of seven Democratic leadership positions in the California Senate.

In 2020, Senator Gonzalez chaired a newly formed bipartisan committee of eleven senators that was tasked with reviewing the state's response to the COVID-19 health crisis. In her time as chair of the Special Committee on Pandemic Emergency Response, Gonzalez led a series of hearings to inform and strengthen the strategic response to the COVID-19 pandemic, covering topics such as testing and contact tracing, workplace health and safety issues and K-12 distance learning.

Legislation 
Senator Gonzalez's first bill, SB 1255 “The Equal Insurance HIV Act”  was signed into law on September 26, 2020. The new law prohibits life and disability income insurance companies from denying coverage to HIV-positive individuals solely based on their HIV status.

At the beginning of the 2020-2021 legislative session, Senator Gonzalez introduced Senate Bill 4 “The Broadband for All Act” to help close the digital divide. She has introduced over a dozen new measures for the 2020-2021 legislative session.

Senator Gonzalez introduced legislation in 2022 to require CalPERS and CalSTRS to engage in fossil fuel divestment to align with the state's climate action goals.

References

External links 
 
 Campaign website
 Join California Lena Gonzalez
 

Democratic Party California state senators
1981 births
Living people
People from Long Beach, California
California city council members
Hispanic and Latino American state legislators in California
Hispanic and Latino American women in politics
Women city councillors in California
Women state legislators in California
21st-century American politicians
21st-century American women politicians
Politicians from Los Angeles
California State University, Long Beach alumni
Loyola Marymount University alumni